Amy Carlson (born 1968) is a U.S. television actor.

Amy Carlson also refers to:

 Amy Carlson (1975–2021), leader of the Love Has Won religious cult, also known as “Mother God”
 Amy Carlson-Helo, winner of the 2017 Miss Washington USA

See also
 Amy (disambiguation)
 Carlson (disambiguation)